Morón Airport  is  southwest of the center of Morón, a western suburb of Buenos Aires in the Buenos Aires Province of Argentina.

The airport is located within a densely populated metropolitan area. The runway length includes a  displaced threshold on Runway 20.

Description 

Morón was the base of the defunct airline CATA, which operated between 1986 and 2004.

Also located at Morón are the following institutions:
 the Museo Nacional de Aeronáutica, an aircraft museum with historic aircraft on display.
 the Instituto Nacional de Aviación Civil, a government organization providing training to civilian pilots and technicians.
 a flying school operated by the Aero Club Argentino (Argentine Air Club)
 several private flying schools.

Military use 
From 1951 to 1988 was the location of the VII Air Brigade (Spanish: VII Brigada Aérea) of the Argentine Air Force, which operated various aircraft, including: Gloster Meteor, Morane-Saulnier MS-760, Bell UH-1D, Hughes 369, Sikorsky S-58T, Grumman Albatross, and T-34 Mentor.

See also
Transport in Argentina
List of airports in Argentina

References

External links
OpenStreetMap - Morón Airport
Morón Airport at The Airport Guide

 Current weather for Morón at Servicio Meteorológico Nacional
 World Airport Codes website, Morón AR page (accessed 2015-03-15)

Airports in Argentina
Argentine Air Force bases